Kingdom Coaster is the name of a wooden roller coaster located at Dutch Wonderland near Lancaster, Pennsylvania.  The first coaster ever built by Custom Coasters International, it uses a single Philadelphia Toboggan Company train with buzz bars. The park's monorail runs through the structure of the ride.

It was known as the Sky Princess prior to the 2007 season.

As of the 2017 season, the minimum  height went from Amber(42"-47") level to 46". Anyone at that height or at the Sapphire(48"-53") Level need to go with a responsible rider of the Ruby(54" and up) level.

Ride experience

After the train leaves the station, the ride makes two turns before riders climb the  lift hill. After the  drop, the ride turns and goes up a bunny hill. It is followed by many bunny hills, a tunnel, and even banked turns. Shortly after, the ride hits the brakes and returns the train back to the station.

References

Roller coasters in Pennsylvania
Roller coasters introduced in 1992